Lionel Plumenail (born 22 January 1967) is a French fencer. He won a gold medal in the team foil at the 2000 Summer Olympics in Sydney, Athens, together with Jean-Noël Ferrari, Brice Guyart and Patrice Lhotellier. He also won a silver medal in the individual foil at the 1996 Summer Olympics.

References

1967 births
Living people
French male foil fencers
Olympic fencers of France
Olympic gold medalists for France
Olympic silver medalists for France
Fencers at the 1996 Summer Olympics
Fencers at the 2000 Summer Olympics
Olympic medalists in fencing
Sportspeople from Bordeaux
Medalists at the 1996 Summer Olympics
Medalists at the 2000 Summer Olympics
Universiade medalists in fencing
Universiade bronze medalists for France